Macrocilix maia is a moth in the family Drepanidae first described by John Henry Leech in 1888. It is found in India, Japan, Taiwan, Korea, China, Peninsular Malaysia, Sumatra and Borneo.

Adults have been recorded in May.

The larvae feed on the leaves of Quercus variabilis. They have a creamy body, marked with dark brown in a longitudinally reticulate manner. Some segments have a rufous suffusion.

The moth features two symmetrical patterns resembling flies feeding on bird droppings. The moth has a pungent odor.

References

Moths described in 1888
Drepaninae
Moths of Japan